Ineu is a commune in Bihor County, Crișana, Romania with a population of 4,399 people. It is composed of three villages: Botean (Mezőbottyán), Husasău de Criș (Köröskisújfalu) and Ineu.

References

Communes in Bihor County
Localities in Crișana